Liebeskonzil is a 1982 film by Werner Schroeter, based on an 1894 play by Oskar Panizza. It was banned by the Austrian government in 1985, on the grounds that it insulted the Christian religion. In 1994, in the case of Otto-Preminger-Institut v. Austria, the European Court of Human Rights held by 6 votes to 3 that the banning of the film was a justifiable limitation on the freedom of expression, because the film would offend Austrian Roman Catholics.

External links 
ECHR judgement

1982 films
1980s avant-garde and experimental films
German avant-garde and experimental films
West German films
1980s German-language films
German films based on plays
Films critical of the Catholic Church
Article 10 of the European Convention on Human Rights
European Court of Human Rights cases involving Austria
1980s German films